The 1984–85 Winnipeg Jets season was the 13th season of the Winnipeg Jets, sixth season in the National Hockey League. The Jets tied an NHL record for most 30-goal scorers in a season (6) (first accomplished by the Buffalo Sabres in the 1974-75 season, and equaled by the NY Islanders in the 1977-78 season) and placed second in the Smythe Division to qualify for the playoffs. The Jets defeated the Calgary Flames three games to one in the first round, but lost to the defending and eventual Stanley Cup champion Edmonton Oilers in the second round in a four game sweep.

Offseason
The Jets began the off-season by sending Moe Mantha to the Pittsburgh Penguins to complete a trade on March 5, 1984, in which Winnipeg acquired Randy Carlyle for the Jets first round draft pick in the 1984 NHL Entry Draft and future considerations.  Mantha, who had been with the team since the 1980-81 season, was coming off a 16-goal and 54 point season with the Jets.  The club announced that interim head coach Barry Long would be retained, after he led the Jets to a 25-25-9 record after replacing Tom Watt.

On June 9, 1984, the Jets participated in the 1984 NHL Entry Draft, but did not draft until the second round, 30th overall, when they selected Peter Douris from the University of New Hampshire.  Douris scored 19 goals and 34 points in 37 games with New Hampshire during the 1983-84 season.  On June 13, 1984, Winnipeg traded team captain Lucien DeBlois to the Montreal Canadiens for Perry Turnbull.  Turnbull split the 1983-84 season between the St. Louis Blues and Montreal Canadiens, scoring 20 goals and 35 points in 72 games.  DeBlois was the Jets captain since midway through the 1982-83 season, and in 1983-84, DeBlois had 39 goals and 79 points in 80 games.  The Jets named Dale Hawerchuk as DeBlois' replacement as team captain.

Regular season
 February 23, 1985: Patrick Roy earned the first victory of his NHL career. It was a 6-4 victory over the Winnipeg Jets.

Final standings

Schedule and results

Playoffs
The Jets beat the Calgary Flames in the Division semi-finals, 3 games to 1. The Jets were swept in 4 games by the Edmonton Oilers in the Division finals.

Player statistics

Regular season
Scoring

Goaltending

Playoffs
Scoring

Goaltending

Awards and records

Transactions

Trades

Draft picks
The Jets selected the following players at the 1984 NHL Entry Draft, which was held at the Montreal Forum in Montreal, Quebec on June 9, 1984.

NHL Amateur Draft

Farm teams

See also
 1984–85 NHL season

References

External links

Winnipeg Jets season, 1984-85
Winnipeg Jets (1972–1996) seasons
Winn